The Confederate Monument, also known as the Dale County Confederate Soldiers Monument, is a Confederate memorial in Ozark, Alabama, in the United States. The monument was installed in 1910 by the Stonewall Jackson Chapter, United Daughters of the Confederacy No. 667 of Dale County, Alabama.

See also

 1910 in art
 Confederate Monument (Camden, Alabama)
 Confederate Monument (Fort Payne, Alabama)
 Confederate Monument (Troy, Alabama)
 List of Confederate monuments and memorials

References

1910 establishments in Alabama
Buildings and structures in Dale County, Alabama
Confederate States of America monuments and memorials in Alabama
Outdoor sculptures in Alabama